Matteo Baiocco (born 23 April 1984) is an Italian motorcycle racer. He was the CIV Superbike champion in 2011, 2012 and 2016. In 2017, he will compete in the CIV Superbike Championship aboard an Aprilia RSV4.

Career statistics

Supersport World Championship

Races by year

Superbike World Championship

Races by year

References

External links
Profile on WorldSBK.com

1984 births
Living people
Italian motorcycle racers
Superbike World Championship riders
Supersport World Championship riders
Sportspeople from the Province of Ancona
FIM Superstock 1000 Cup riders
British Superbike Championship riders